Hershey Wildcats were a professional soccer team, based in Hershey, Pennsylvania, United States, that played in the USL A-League between 1997 and 2001. The team was owned by Hershey Entertainment and Resorts Company. The team played in Hersheypark Stadium, located at Hersheypark, and received its name from the Wild Cat roller coaster. In the Wildcats' 5-year history, the average attendance was 3,189 per game.

History

The Wildcats were moderately successful in their short existence, with Bob Lilley coaching the team for its entire five-year run, leading the Wildcats to the playoffs in each season. In 2001, Hershey reached the A-League finals but were defeated 2–0 by the Rochester Raging Rhinos.

Less than a week after the championship match, in October 2001, Hershey Entertainment announced that the Wildcats were folding.  Weak attendance, including a crowd of only 750 for the 2001 playoff semifinal, was a factor in the decision to fold the team.  With the league unable to find a new owner for the club, the players became free agents.

Notable players that played for the Wildcats and then went on to play in Major League Soccer or other professional leagues include Jon Busch and Christof Lindenmayer.

Year-by-year

See also
D.C. United

References

Defunct soccer clubs in Pennsylvania
A-League (1995–2004) teams
1997 establishments in Pennsylvania
2001 disestablishments in Pennsylvania
Soccer clubs in Pennsylvania
Defunct sports teams in Pennsylvania
Association football clubs established in 1997
Association football clubs disestablished in 2001
Hershey, Pennsylvania